Max and Paddy's Road to Nowhere is a British sitcom starring and written by Peter Kay and Patrick McGuinness. It was broadcast on Channel 4 and began on 12 November 2004, running for six 30-minute episodes up until 17 December 2004. A spin-off from Peter Kay's Phoenix Nights,  the series follows the two Bolton doormen/bouncers Maxwell "Max" Bygraves (Kay) and Patrick "Paddy" O'Shea (McGuinness) as they tour around the UK in their campervan. They are fugitives due to an incident in the last episodes of Phoenix Nights, in which a club patron threatened to have them killed by hitmen.

Background
Although the series was broadcast two years after Peter Kay's Phoenix Nights, the plot is set immediately after the events of the previous series. Max is the older and more level-headed of the two, roughly 40 years old, and usually pretending to have more life experience than he has actually had, including a stint in the army. Paddy is an idealistic wide boy obsessed with sex, pornography and food. Max often oppressively stares at Paddy or anyone who has offended his tastes and often shouts "H-how dare you!". He also calls people a clown or a melon if they've said something absurd.

The motor home originally purchased by Max in Phoenix Nights was a Ford; however, the motor home they use in Max and Paddy's Road to Nowhere is a Fiat. Peter Kay touched on this in the DVD commentary of Phoenix Nights, saying that he should have told the production company to buy a larger motor home than the Ford as he intended to use it in the spin-off.

Theme song
The theme song was written by Toni Baker and Peter Kay, and borrowed heavily from the theme to the 1970s American series B. J. and the Bear. The lyrics are "Don't know where we're going, Got no way of knowing, Driving on the Road to Nowhere. Sponging for a living, Checkin' out the women, Riding on the Road to Nowhere... And we don't take shit from anyone, The only thing we wanna do is have some fun. We're Max and Paddy (Paddy and Max!), And best of all, we don't pay council tax!".

Singer Tony Christie was to sing the show's theme, but his version was only used once, at the very end of the final episode. Kay and McGuinness themselves sang it in the opening sequences of episodes 2 to 6. Episode 1's opening theme is instrumental and episodes 2 - 5's closing themes are too.

Episodes

Episode 1
In Dover, Max and Paddy buy a plasma television from an Irish crook called Gypsy Joe (played by Brendan O'Carroll). This leads to several arguments, especially when they realise the television doesn't have any speakers. The pair thus decide to go out to a nightclub to cheer themselves up and relax, but Max's uncoordinated dancing spoils the night and he ends up fighting with some sailors home on shore leave. Paddy teaches him a few cool moves the following day, and they return to the club dressed as sailors in order to blend in. Their new moves lure two local girls, Tracey and Louise, back to the campervan, only for one of them to steal Paddy's wallet. After discovering the girls, locally known as the 'Belgrano Sisters', are infamous for this, they get revenge by forcing them to steal some speakers for their television.

This episode had 4.2m viewers.

Episode 2
After a stint in a porn film (a film called Willy Wanker and the Chocolate Factory - a gay porn parody of Willy Wonka & the Chocolate Factory) leaves Paddy humiliated, the campervan breaks down in the Midlands. The pair hand it over to a local garage run by Mick Bustin, played by Noddy Holder. While waiting, Max and Paddy catch the train to Middlewood, which actually turns out to be the last one that day, so the pair are forced to trek back through the woods, but get lost. After Max shows an incredulous Paddy his notebook filled with childlike drawings of a television programme he's invented called "Magnet and Steel", the pair reluctantly decide to sleep rough in the woods. Paddy causes tension by burning Max's book on their campfire, but Max eventually forgives Paddy and begins discussing, accompanied by a flashback, his one true love: a dwarf called Tina, whom he met in 1994.

He goes on to say that the relationship abruptly ended after she overheard him and his friends making jokes about her height. The following morning, the two discover to their annoyance that they were a short walk away from a Petrol Station and a Travelodge. Their situation worsens when Mick Bustin tries to charge them £500 to retrieve the campervan, causing the pair to break into Bustin's workshop and, in a parody of The A-Team, modify the van and 'bust' out back on to the road, only for the van to break down again miles later, Mick Bustin having never actually made any repairs.

This episode features several regulars from Peter Kay's Phoenix Nights, and a homage to the movie Midnight Cowboy. Paddy's full name is revealed to be Patrick O'Shea. This joke is based around the rumour that Sunderland player John O'Shea is regularly teased by team-mates for his physical resemblance to Patrick McGuinness.

This episode had 3.26m viewers.

Episode 3
The pair arrive in London, and immediately have an altercation with the traffic police. Later, Max spots in a local newspaper a 40th birthday message for his old school friend Kevin 'The Wolfster' Wolfson, who had moved to London some years before. Max and Paddy turn up unannounced at his birthday party and surprise 'The Wolfster', as well as several other old faces from home present for the party. Tina (played by Lisa Hammond), Max's one true love mentioned in the previous episode, turns up. Max tries to make amends with her, and discovers that she is actually married to, and has a child with, The Wolfster.

However, the child, a 10-year-old boy called Daniel, is actually Max's son. Tina warns Max to keep his distance and not reveal the secret, but the following morning he informs Paddy and the pair steal what they think is a school bus with young Daniel aboard. They've got the wrong bus however, and are soon captured by the police and sent directly to prison. The actor/comedian Reece Shearsmith turns up in this episode as one of Max's old friends. The 'Row Row Row Your Boat' sequence on the bus is borrowed from Dirty Harry, and in the scene where The Wolfster writes his telephone number on a beermat and hands it to Max, it is clearly a Peter Kay beermat, tying in with Kay's TV adverts for John Smith's Brewery bitter.

This episode had 3.01m viewers.

Episode 4 
The pair are now in prison after the school bus siege. Paddy is then forced to share a cell with a tennis-playing Cliff Richard impersonator who actually believes he is Cliff. After a bad first night, Paddy admits his fear of being 'bummed' in the shower room. Max convinces him the best thing to do is make the other prisoners believe they are not just two inept doormen, but feared gangsters called 'The Phoenix Twins'. After a fight with a camp inmate called Pepe, Max and Paddy are soon confronted by the main man of their wing, Raymond The Bastard (played by Everal Walsh), who is also Pepe's boyfriend. Raymond is the worse of Paddy's nightmares when Paddy drops the soap, and is eagerly commented about his manhood as "Stunning, like a young Burt Reynolds!". Raymond has heard about the pair's alleged big-money heists and robberies, and wants a cut of their money. Max agrees just to get Raymond off their backs and receive preferential treatment, including access to luxury chocolates and Sky+ .

Soon, their old Phoenix Club boss Brian Potter (played by Kay) unexpectedly comes to visit, along with a cake, announcing that he's organising several events to help speed up their release. They reject him, not wanting a high-profile campaign ruining their chances of release. Potter fails to listen, and the whole wing later see him on the news talking about 'the doormen' Max and Paddy: thus revealing their stories as lies. A big fight is about to break out between Raymond and his henchmen against Max and Paddy. However, the fight is prevented by a prison officer telling Max and Paddy to come with him. The episode concludes with Tina, Max's ex-love, admitting to the authorities that Daniel is actually Max's son and he was acting under stress when he stole the bus. The pair are released, having their sentences reduced to community service, and get revenge on Brian Potter by informing the Home Office that there is an outbreak of anthrax at his club. We find out in this episode that Max's full name is Maxwell Bygraves, a jokey reference to the veteran British entertainer Max Bygraves.

This episode had 3.16m viewers.

Episode 5
In the West Country, Paddy is driving the van when he accidentally runs over and kills a cow walking in the road. Tracing the cow to a nearby farm, the pair head off to find the farmer and claim expenses for the damage to the van. They come across what they assume is him: a mentally unstable, dirty old man in a field, who instead of giving them compensation money sells them a breeder pig for £100. He claims they can sell it on at market for around £300. When Max and Paddy reach the cattle market, they discover the pig in ill health and they've been conned. After several unsuccessful attempts to sell the pig on to butchers shops, a supermarket, and even a Halal outlet, Max and Paddy decide to kill it themselves to get rid of the burden. They have a change of heart though and head back to the farm to reclaim their £100. They soon discover that the old man who sold them the pig initially was actually the alcoholic father-in-law of the real farmer, and their money has probably all gone to the nearest pub. Also the farmer isn't very happy about the two killing one of his cows. Guest starring Graham Walker of The Grumbleweeds.

This episode had 3.43m viewers.

Episode 6
Max and Paddy drive into North East England to visit Max's old doorman friend Billy 'The Butcher' Shannon, who had previously briefly appeared in the 1994 flashback in Episode 2. They agree to let Shannon, who is looking for his estranged son, hitch a ride around. They soon discover though that he's obsessed with Max ("Not in a gay way" he claims), and detests Paddy because Paddy took Billy’s job when Billy went to prison. What they fail to notice at the same time is that Shannon is carrying a revolver, which he uses to force a Little Chef employee called Brenda (played by Alex Hall) to open for the trio late at night. The police are quickly on to the gang, with only Shannon aware of any crime. When the campervan stops off later down the road, Max sees a newspaper headline and realises what's happening. Furthermore, Billy catches Paddy going through his stuff and prepares to shoot him.

A chase eventually ensues through the services and along a motorway tunnel bridge, and Shannon shoots Paddy in the bottom. As he's about to shoot Max, Paddy has a second wind, and whacks Shannon around the head with a traffic cone, using Peter Kay's TV catchphrase of "'Ave It!" in the process. With Shannon now unconscious and arrested, Max and Paddy slip away from a police lecture - due to the fact that earlier in the episode they cut down a speed camera - and drive-off into the night.

This episode had 3.26m viewers.

Future
A second series of the show was initially planned for 2006, but Peter Kay instead confirmed a third series of Phoenix Nights (which as of 2022 has not yet happened). On 22 February 2010, Peter Kay stated to The Sun that he and Paddy McGuinness planned to do more specials of Max and Paddy's Road To Nowhere. He wanted Phil 'The Pastie' Murphy to play the portly soldier in love with Max's mother. He had also stated in 2010, during an appearance on The Chris Moyles Show, that he wanted Sir Terry Wogan to play an Irish baddie when Max and Paddy go to a funeral in Ireland but, after a stag night, only have fancy dress magician clothes. Mayhem would then ensue as they tried to act appropriately in the situation, only to keep unintentionally doing magic tricks based on what they found in their outfits.

On 27 November 2014 live shows were announced for Comic Relief, with the full cast returning.

Max & Paddy's The Power of Two
A spoof fitness DVD was released, Max & Paddy's The Power of Two, including several gags and pieces of scenery from the main series. The DVD also included extra workout tips and a segment instructed by Brian Potter live from the Phoenix Club. On the DVD packaging, it is now referred to as "The UK's fastest selling fitness DVD – Ever!" Although the main workout is shown in full, it is more intended as a spoof product than a genuine workout.

DVD audio commentary
Kay and McGuinness do not provide the DVD audio commentary.
 Episode one: Colin Murray and Edith Bowman
 Episode two: Bez and Shaun Ryder
 Episode three: Vernon Kay and Tess Daly
 Episode four: Vernon Kay and Tess Daly
 Episode five: Keith Harris and Orville the Duck
 Episode six: Stuart Hall and Stuart Maconie

See also
 Phoenix Nights
 Peter Kay's Britain's Got the Pop Factor... and Possibly a New Celebrity Jesus Christ Soapstar Superstar Strictly on Ice

References

External links

Channel 4 sitcoms
2000s British sitcoms
2004 British television series debuts
2004 British television series endings
English-language television shows
British television spin-offs